Body Count is a 1998 crime film and starred David Caruso, Linda Fiorentino, John Leguizamo, Ving Rhames, Donnie Wahlberg, and Forest Whitaker. The film was directed by Robert Patton-Spruill.

Plot
A group of thieves attempt to rob an art gallery, but when plans backfire and one of the men winds up dead, the group head down south, running afoul of the law. Along the way, they meet up with a seductive con artist with ideas of her own.

Cast
 David Caruso as Hobbs
 Linda Fiorentino as Natalie
 John Leguizamo as Chino
 Ving Rhames as Pike
 Donnie Wahlberg as Booker
 Forest Whitaker as Crane

Production
During development, it had been announced in the press under the titles Framed and The Split.

Release
The film was released direct to video on April 28, 1998, due to poor audience reaction at test screenings.

References

External links
 
 

1998 films
1990s crime comedy films
1998 crime thriller films
1998 direct-to-video films
American crime thriller films
Films directed by Robert Patton-Spruill
1990s English-language films
1990s American films